The Chindeni is a right tributary of the river Mureș in Harghita County, Romania. It joins the Mureș near Voșlăbeni.

References

Rivers of Romania
Rivers of Harghita County